Potassium voltage-gated channel, Shal-related subfamily, member 1 (KCND1), also known as Kv4.1, is a human gene.

Voltage-gated potassium (Kv) channels represent the most complex class of voltage-gated ion channels from both functional and structural standpoints. Their diverse functions include regulating neurotransmitter release, heart rate, insulin secretion, neuronal excitability, epithelial electrolyte transport, smooth muscle contraction, and cell volume. Four sequence-related potassium channel genes - shaker, shaw, shab, and shal - have been identified in Drosophila, and each has been shown to have human homolog(s). This gene encodes a member of the potassium channel, voltage-gated, shal-related subfamily, members of which form voltage-activated A-type potassium ion channels and are prominent in the repolarization phase of the action potential. This gene is expressed at moderate levels in all tissues analyzed, with lower levels in skeletal muscle.

See also
 Voltage-gated potassium channel

References

Further reading

Ion channels